Rhone Glacier is a glacier lying west of Matterhorn Glacier and flowing south toward the junction of Lake Bonney and Taylor Glacier in Victoria Land, Antarctica. It was charted and named by the British Antarctic Expedition, 1910–13, under Robert Falcon Scott.

References
 

Glaciers of Victoria Land
McMurdo Dry Valleys